The 1921 Detroit Titans football team represented the University of Detroit in the 1921 college football season. Detroit shut out seven of nine opponents, outscored all opponents by a combined total of 245 to 24, and finished with an 8–1 record in their fourth year under head coach James F. Duffy. The team was undefeated during its regular season. After the season end, a post-season playoff game was scheduled between Detroit and another undefeated team, Washington & Jefferson, with the winner to play in the 1922 Rose Bowl. Washington & Jefferson defeated Detroit, 14–2, and was later recognized as co-national champion.

In addition to head coach Duffy, the coaching staff included assistant coaches James M. Brown and E. Britt Patterson, trainer Harry H. Crowley, team physician William E. Keane, and publicity director Edward A. Batchelor.

The team included Gus Sonnenberg who went on to play eight seasons in the National Football League.

Schedule

References

External links
 1921 University of Detroit football programs

Detroit
Detroit Titans football seasons
Detroit Titans football
Detroit Titans football